Varazaneh (also Romanized as Varāzāneh and Vorāzāneh; also known as Varāzeneh) is a village in Sarab Rural District, Giyan District, Nahavand County, Hamadan Province, Iran. At the 2006 census, its population was 1,019, in 247 families. The rainiest month in Varazaneh is April, when it averages 73.9mm of precipitation.

References 

Populated places in Nahavand County